Claudia Muciño (born 16 December 1971) is a Mexican former professional tennis player.

A right-handed player, Muciño appeared in five ties for Mexico as a doubles player in the 1994 Federation Cup.

Muciño won six ITF doubles titles while competing on the professional tour and played college tennis at Brenau University in the United States, earning NAIA All American honours in 1997.

ITF finals

Doubles: 13 (6–7)

References

External links
 
 
 

1971 births
Living people
Mexican female tennis players
Brenau Golden Tigers women's tennis players
20th-century Mexican women
21st-century Mexican women